is an underground railway station located beneath Terminal 2 of Narita International Airport in Narita, Chiba, Japan. The station is linked to Higashi-Narita Station by a 500 m underground passage. The station serves both Terminal 2 and the nearby Terminal 3.

Lines
 JR East
 Keisei Electric Railway
 Narita Sky Access Line to Keisei-Ueno (via ), including Skyliner limited express services

Station layout

Narita Airport Terminal 2·3 Station is shared between East Japan Railway Company (JR East) and Keisei Electric Railway. There is a common concourse on level B1F of the main Terminal 2 building and then platforms below, using double track originally intended for the Narita Shinkansen.

There is a security checkpoint between the station exit and the terminal building where identification (such as a passport) must be shown and baggage may be inspected. The security checkpoint is only connected to the Keisei side of the station, so JR passengers disembarking at this station go through two ticket gates: one between the JR and Keisei stations, and one exiting the Keisei station. A future renovation of the station is planned to streamline the exit process for JR passengers.

JR East

JR East uses the northern platform, which is to the side of a single track used for both inbound and outbound trains.

Keisei Electric Railway

Keisei uses the southern platform, a single island platform divided in half crosswise by a metal fence to form four numbered tracks. Tracks 1 and 2, on the eastern half of the platform, are used for Narita Sky Access trains including the Skyliner limited express service. Tracks 3 and 4, on the western half of the platform, are used for Keisei Main Line trains. Passengers not using the Narita Sky Access Line must pass through a second ticket barrier prior to entering the platforms in order to enforce the separate fare structure for Narita Sky Access trains.

Platform 3, used for Keisei Main Line trains bound for Tokyo, is only long enough to accommodate six cars; therefore two cars of each eight-car Keisei Main Line trainset open onto Track 1, the Tokyo-bound Narita Sky Access Line platform. Keisei has installed special signage in this section of Track 1 to warn passengers not to board these cars.

History
Narita Airport Terminal 2·3 Station opened on 3 December 1992, shortly prior to the opening of Terminal 2 itself. The second track for Keisei trains opened on 14 November 2009, as part of the construction project for the Narita Sky Access Line. Skyliner limited express services began operations on the Sky Access Line on 17 July 2010. The station also received a station number for Keisei services on that date; Narita Airport Terminal 2·3 Station was assigned station number KS41.

See also
 List of railway stations in Japan

References

External links

 JR-East Station map 
 Airport Terminal 2 Station information 
 Keisei Station map

Railway stations in Chiba Prefecture
Railway stations in Japan opened in 1992
Keisei Main Line
Narita Line
Airport railway stations in Japan
Narita International Airport
Railway stations in Narita, Chiba